Ahmad Al-Kudmani (born August 18, 1979) is a Saudi Arabian former swimmer, who specialized in breaststroke events. He is a two-time Olympian and a multiple-time medalist at the Pan Arab Games.

Al-Kudmani made his first all-male Saudi Arabian team, at the 2000 Summer Olympics in Sydney, where he competed in the men's 100 m breaststroke. Swimming in heat two, he picked up a fourth spot and fifty-sixth overall by a tenth of a second (0.10) behind Madagascar's Jean Luc Razakarivony in 1:06.07.

At the 2004 Summer Olympics in Athens, Al-Kudmani qualified again for the men's 100 m breaststroke by receiving a Universality place from FINA in an invitation time of 1:06.07. He challenged seven other swimmers on the same heat as Sydney, including his former rival Razakarivony. He blasted a Saudi Arabian record and a personal best of 1:05.65 to share a second seed with Moldova's Andrei Capitanciuc. Al-Kudmani failed to advance into the semifinals, as he placed forty-seventh overall on the first day of preliminaries.

Al-Kudmani is a former varsity swimmer for the USC Trojans, and a graduate of mechanical engineering at the University of Southern California in Los Angeles. He also competed at the Asian Games (2002 and 2006), but failed to medal in any of his individual events. In 2007, Al-Kudmani announced his retirement from swimming to spend time with his family and work for the seawater injection department at Saudi Aramco.

References

External links
Player Bio – USC Trojans

1979 births
Living people
Saudi Arabian male swimmers
Olympic swimmers of Saudi Arabia
Swimmers at the 2000 Summer Olympics
Swimmers at the 2004 Summer Olympics
Swimmers at the 2002 Asian Games
Swimmers at the 2006 Asian Games
Male breaststroke swimmers
Sportspeople from Jeddah
USC Trojans men's swimmers
USC Viterbi School of Engineering alumni
Asian Games competitors for Saudi Arabia
Islamic Solidarity Games competitors for Saudi Arabia
Islamic Solidarity Games medalists in swimming
20th-century Saudi Arabian people
21st-century Saudi Arabian people